Capital of the Alps may refer to:

 Grenoble, a city of the Isère department, Auvergne-Rhône-Alpes, France
 Innsbruck, the capital of Tyrol, Austria
 Turin, the capital of Piedmont, Italy